Last Nite  is a live album by Larry Carlton, released in 1986. Recorded at the Baked Potato in North Hollywood, California, Carlton is supported by keyboardist Terry Trotter, bassist Abraham Laboriel, drummer John Robinson, and percussionist Alex Acuña.

Technical note: Carlton, who is known as "Mr. 335" because of his preference of the Gibson ES-335 semi-hollow body guitar in his early career, used a custom-made Valley Arts Strat solid-body guitar with active EMG pick-ups for these recordings, which accounts for the distinctly different tone when compared to earlier Carlton recordings.

Track listing
All tracks composed by Larry Carlton; except where indicated
"So What" 	(Miles Davis)	7:57
"Don't Give It Up" 	 	5:32
"The B.P. Blues" 	 	7:53
"All Blues" 	(Miles Davis) 	8:18
"Last Nite" 	 	7:57
"Emotions Wound Us So" 	 	6:17

Personnel
 Larry Carlton – guitar
 Gary Grant – trumpet
 Jerry Hey – trumpet
 Mark Russo – saxophone
 Terry Trotter – keyboards
 Abraham Laboriel – bass
 John Robinson - drums (except on "All Blues")
 Rick Marotta – drums on "All Blues"
 Alex Acuña – percussion
 Steve Carlton - Recording Engineer

References

1986 live albums
Larry Carlton albums
Live jazz fusion albums
MCA Records live albums